The Gulf Between is a 1917 American comedy-drama film that was the first motion picture made in Technicolor, the fourth feature-length color film, and the first feature-length color film produced in the United States. The film was destroyed in a fire on 25 March 1961. Today, the film is considered a lost film, with only very short fragments known to survive. These fragments are in the collections of the Margaret Herrick Library, George Eastman House Motion Picture Collection, and the Smithsonian National Museum of American History Photographic History Collection.

The Gulf Between, which had a running time of approximately 58 minutes, was directed by Wray Physioc. The lead roles were played by Grace Darmond and Niles Welch.

Plot
As described in the film magazine Exhibitors Herald, little Marie Farrell (Axzelle), through the carelessness of her nurse, is lost and believed drowned. She has wandered upon the ship of the smuggler Captain Flagg (Brandt), who finds her and brings her up as his own. Her parents adopt a boy to help them forget their grief.

The girl grows up with no memory of her former life. The adopted boy moves in the smart set in Mayport, and his parents try to make a match between him and a society girl. Marie (Darmond) is brought to her adoptive father's sister, as the old captain believes she should have the care of a loving woman. She meets young Richard Farrell (Welch) and the two come to love each other. The Farrells do everything they can to break up the couple, but with the help of the captain a marriage is accomplished. There is a stormy meeting between the bridal pair and the parents, during which the captain sees a portrait of Marie as a baby and, realizing the truth, tells the story of her life. The family is reunited and Mary and Richard spend their honeymoon on the captain's ship.

Cast
 Grace Darmond as Marie
 Niles Welch as Richard Farrell
 Herbert Fortier as Robert Farrell
 Violet Axzelle as a young Marie
 Charles Brandt as Captain Flagg
 Joseph Dailey as Cook
 George De Carlton as Dutch
 Caroline Harris as Mrs. Farrell
 Virginia Lee as Millicent Dunston
 Louis Montjoy		
 J. Noa as Pete

Production
The Gulf Between was filmed on location in Jacksonville, Florida in 1917 by the Technicolor Motion Picture Corporation, using its two-color "System 1", in which, by means of a prism beam splitter, two consecutive frames of a single strip of black-and-white film were photographed simultaneously, one behind a red filter and the other behind a green filter.

Release
After private trade showings in Boston on September 13, 1917, and at Aeolian Hall in New York City on September 21, 1917, it was released on February 25, 1918, to play one-week engagements on a tour of a few major Eastern cities, accompanied by the special two-aperture, two-lens, two-filter projector required to exhibit it. Because of the technical problems in keeping the red and green images aligned by prism during projection, it was the only motion picture made in Technicolor's System 1. Technicolor abandoned the additive color process of System 1, and began work on subtractive color processes that did not require a special projector.

Critical reception
Photoplay magazine complained that all colors were reduced into terms of reds and greens, and that "the story is dull, trite, and drawn out interminably."

Notes

References

External links
 
 The Gulf Between at Widescreen Museum with copy of film frame

1917 films
1917 comedy-drama films
1917 lost films
1910s color films
American silent feature films
Early color films
Films set in Florida
Films shot in Jacksonville, Florida
Lost American films
Lost comedy-drama films
Silent films in color
1910s English-language films
Films directed by Wray Physioc
1910s American films
Silent American comedy-drama films